Bjørn Dahl may refer to:

 Bjørn Dahl (footballer, born 1954), Norwegian footballer 
 Bjørn Dahl (footballer, born 1978), Norwegian footballer